Jory Restaurant, or simply Jory, is a restaurant at the Allison Inn and Spa in Newberg, Oregon, United States.

Description and reception 
Jory offers farm-to-table dining. The Modern American menu has included English pea soup, halibut with asparagus, and Oregon pinot noirs. Frommer's gives the restaurant a rating of three out of three stars and says: 

Jory was included in Wine Enthusiast magazine's 2017 list of "America's 100 Best Wine Restaurants". In 2018, Gerry Frank included the Allison Inn and Spa and Jory in The Oregonian's overview of "the best of the Willamette Valley".

Forbes Travel Guide rates the restaurant four out of five stars, as of 2022.

See also 

 List of New American restaurants

References

External links 

 Jory Restaurant at the Allison Inn and Spa
 Jory at Zomato

New American restaurants in Oregon
Newberg, Oregon